Major General Halfdan Fenton Harboe Hertzberg  (3 September 1884 – 21 December 1959) was a Canadian general and Commandant of the Royal Military College of Canada during the Second World War. He also served as Quartermaster General and Adjutant-General for the Canadian Army, narrowly missing the position of Chief of General Staff (CGS).

Military career

Hertzberg was a descendant of a well-known military family from Norway. He was educated at Upper Canada College and St. Andrew's College, before getting an engineering degree at University of Toronto.

He served with the Canadian Expeditionary Force (CEF) on the Western Front during World War I, earning himself both the Military Cross (MC) and the Distinguished Service Order (DSO), as well as the rank of colonel.

After the war, he remained in the army, and attended the British Army's Staff College.

Family
Hertzberg's brother, Charles Hertzberg, was also a major general. They were the only two brothers to reach general officer rank at the same time in the Canadian Army.

References

External links
Generals of World War II

1884 births
1959 deaths
Military personnel from Toronto
Canadian Companions of the Order of the Bath
Canadian Companions of the Distinguished Service Order
Commandants of the Royal Military College of Canada
Canadian military personnel of World War I
Canadian recipients of the Military Cross
Canadian Expeditionary Force officers
Canadian Army generals of World War II
People from Old Toronto
Graduates of the Staff College, Camberley
St. Andrew's College (Aurora) alumni
Royal Canadian Engineers officers
Canadian generals